was a Japanese painter who lived during the Azuchi–Momoyama period of Japanese history and one of the most prominent patriarchs of the Kanō school of Japanese painting.

Life and works

Born in Kyoto, Eitoku was the grandson of Kanō Motonobu (1476–1559), an official painter for the Ashikaga shogunate. He was recognized for his artistic talent at a very young age. Under Motonobu's guidance, he developed his grandfather's style, which had influence from Chinese painting.

Collaborating with his father Shōei (1519–92), Eitoku painted the wall panels of the abbot's quarters in Jukō-in, a subtemple of the Daitoku-ji Zen monastic complex in Kyoto.

Eitoku's patrons included Oda Nobunaga and Toyotomi Hideyoshi.  His standing screen, sliding door, wall, and ceiling paintings decorated Nobunaga's Azuchi castle and Hideyoshi's residence in Kyoto and Osaka Castle.  Contemporary accounts indicate that Eitoku was one of the most highly sought-after artists of his time, and received many wealthy and powerful patrons.  Maintaining the preeminence of the Kanō School was not merely an artistic feat, but an organizational and political one also.  Eitoku was able to secure a steady stream of commissions and an efficient workshop of students and assistants, and at one point successfully intercepted a warlord's commission of the rival Hasegawa studio.

Style
His signal contribution to the Kanō repertoire was the so-called "monumental style" (taiga), characterized by bold, rapid brushwork, an emphasis on foreground, and motifs that are large relative to the pictorial space.  The traditional account for this style, codified by Eitoku's great-grandson Einō (1631–97) in his History of Japanese Painting (Honcho gashi), is that it resulted partly from the exigencies of Eitoku's busy schedule, and that it embodied the martial and political bravura of the warlords, Nobunaga and Hideyoshi.

Unfortunately, most of his works were destroyed in the turmoil of the Sengoku period. However, those that do still exist provide testimony to his talent, to the power and wealth of his patrons Nobunaga and Hideyoshi, and to the magnificence of Azuchi-Momoyama culture. Symbolic representations, like pheasants, phoenixes and trees are often depicted in the works. The pheasant, for example is the national symbol of Japan, are mythological messengers of the sun goddess Amaterasu.

Works

See also
Kanō Sanraku
Japanese art

References

External links 

 National Archives of Japan:  Ryukyu Chuzano ryoshisha tojogyoretsu, scroll illustrating procession of Ryukyu emissary to Edo, 1710 (Hōei 7).
Momoyama, Japanese Art in the Age of Grandeur, an exhibition catalog from The Metropolitan Museum of Art (fully available online as PDF), which contains material on Kanō Eitoku
Bridge of dreams: the Mary Griggs Burke collection of Japanese art, a catalog from The Metropolitan Museum of Art Libraries (fully available online as PDF), which contains material on Kanō Eitoku (see index)

1543 births
1590 deaths
Artists from Kyoto
16th-century Japanese people
16th-century Japanese artists
16th-century Japanese painters
Kanō school